Mankad is a surname. Notable people with the surname include:
Vinoo Mankad (1917–1978), Indian cricketer 
Ashok Mankad (1946–2008), Indian cricketer, son of Vinoo Mankad
Nirupama Mankad (born 1947), Indian tennis player, wife of Ashok Mankad
Harsh Mankad (born 1979), Indian tennis player, son of Ashok and Nirupama Mankad